is a Japanese actor who is affiliated with Toki Entertainment.  He played the role of Yukito Sanjyo (Abare Blue) in the 2003 Super Sentai TV series Bakuryū Sentai Abaranger.

Biography
In 2002, Tomita debuted in the television drama Gokusen.

In 2003, he appeared in Bakuryū Sentai Abaranger as Yukito Sanjyo/Abare Blue.

In 2005, Tomita was scheduled to appear in the television drama Kyōtochiken'noon'na 2 dai 2 Series, but he  was knocked due to illness.

He left Production Oki, and later started an official Ameba blog from June 2008. In July of the same year, Tomita was later scheduled for the stage play Double Booking!.

In 2011, he played Yukito Sanjyo in the 29th episode of Kaizoku Sentai Gokaiger he appeared with Michi Nishijima for the first time for eight years.

In January 2014, Tomita appeared in the film Zyuden Sentai Kyoryuger vs. Go-Busters: The Great Dinosaur Battle! Farewell Our Eternal Friends as Yukito Sanjyo/Abare Blue with Koichiro Nishi for the first time in nine years.

Filmography

TV series

Films

References

External links
 "Toki Entertainment > Management > 富田翔" Official profile at Toki Entertainment 

Japanese male actors
1982 births
Living people
People from Tokyo